Feast or Famine is the third studio album by Philadelphia hip-hop artist Reef the Lost Cauze.
2 other versions of the album were released, an extended version containing 2 bonus tracks "Nat Turner" and You Don't Own Me" and an enhanced cd re-release on Good Hands containing a bonus video.

Track listing

Reef the Lost Cauze albums
2005 albums